Troy Danaskos (born 20 November 1991) is an Australian professional footballer who currently played as a defender for St George City.

His father Tony Danaskos played in the NSL for St George FC.

References

External links
 

Living people
1991 births
Association football defenders
Australian soccer players
Australian people of Greek descent
Wellington Phoenix FC players
A-League Men players
New Zealand Football Championship players